The circuit topology of a folded linear polymer refers to the arrangement of its intra-molecular contacts. Examples of linear polymers with intra-molecular contacts are nucleic acids and proteins. Proteins fold via formation of contacts of various nature, including hydrogen bonds, disulfide bonds, and beta-beta interactions. Contacts in the genome are established via protein bridges including CTCF and cohesins and are measured by technologies including Hi-C. Circuit topology categorises the topological arrangement of these physical contacts, that are referred to as hard contacts. Furthermore, chains can fold via knotting (or formation of "soft" contacts). Circuit topology uses a similar language to categorise both "soft" and "hard" contacts, and provides a full description of a folded linear chain. 

A simple example of a folded chain is a chain with two hard contacts. For a chain with two binary contacts, three arrangements are available: parallel (P), series (S) and crossed (X). For a chain with n contacts, the topology can be described by an n by n matrix in which each element illustrates the relation between a pair of contacts and may take one of the three states, P, S and X. Multivalent contacts can also be categorised in full or via decomposition into several binary contacts. Similarly, circuit topology allows for classification of the pairwise arrangements of chain crossings and tangles, thus providing a complete 3D description of folded chains. Furthermore, one can apply circuit topology operations to soft and hard contacts to generate complex folds.

Circuit topology has implications for folding kinetics and molecular evolution and has been applied to engineer polymers including molecular origami. Circuit topology along with contact order and size are determinants of folding rate of linear polymers.

Further reading 
 B. Scalvini et al., Circuit topology analysis of cellular genome reveals signature motifs, conformational heterogeneity, and scaling. iScience (2022). link 
 B. Scalvini et al., Topological principles of protein folding. PCCP (2021). link
 A. Golovnev at el., Generalized circuit topology of folded linear chains. iScience (2020). link
 M. Heidari et al., Circuit topology analysis of polymer folding reactions. ACS Central Science (2020) link

References

See also 
Molecular topology

Molecular topology
Molecular geometry
Supramolecular chemistry
Topology
Mathematical chemistry